Hyperthelia is a genus of African plants in the grass family.

 Species
 Hyperthelia colobantha Clayton - Central African Rep
 Hyperthelia cornucopiae (Hack.) Clayton - Central African Rep, Chad, South Sudan
 Hyperthelia dissoluta (Nees ex Steud.) Clayton - most of sub-Saharan Africa incl Madagascar; naturalized in Latin America
 Hyperthelia edulis (C.E.Hubb.) Clayton -  South Sudan
 Hyperthelia kottoensis Desc. & Mazade - Central African Rep
 Hyperthelia polychaeta Clayton - Central African Rep

References

Andropogoneae
Poaceae genera